Burnside is a Canadian urban neighbourhood located along the northeast shore of Bedford Basin of the Halifax Regional Municipality in Dartmouth, Nova Scotia.

History 
Burnside was the name originally given to the farm of Duncan Waddell, a Scotsman who had settled the area. Burn comes from the Scottish word for "stream", since one flowed through the property. Gradually, his land was sold off to various industries, including National Gypsum, a brickyard, a steel company, an oil terminal, and the Bedford Magazine.

More recently, Burnside has been the location of a major concentration of industry and commercial development since the 1970 completion of the A. Murray MacKay Bridge near the previously existing Industrial Estate, which had only 4 enterprises prior to the bridge opening. There are very few dwellings in Burnside as it is used almost exclusively for commercial operations; the only residential areas being the adjacent communities of Highfield Park, Albro Lake and Wright's Cove.

Burnside Industrial Park was formally opened by Dartmouth mayor Roland J. Thornhill in December 1969.

Burnside Park
Burnside Park, formerly known as Dartmouth Industrial Park, then Burnside Industrial Park and later Burnside Business Park, is a major commercial and industrial development located in the community of Burnside along the northeast shore of Bedford Basin.

It encompasses about 3,400 acres (1,376 hectares) of land running up the hill from the Basin and was developed as the former City of Dartmouth's industrial park following the completion of the A. Murray MacKay Bridge in 1970.

Current employment estimates state that 17,000 people regularly work in the park and there are more than 1,000 employers.

A wide variety of businesses are located in Burnside, mostly specializing in sales, manufacturing, electronics, transportation, and services. The park is composed mostly of low-rise office buildings, warehouses and retail stores.

Its location has played a large role in its success. The construction of the A. Murray MacKay Bridge resulted in a boom of development in the area, since it provided a quick link to Halifax Peninsula, the Fairview Cove container terminal, the Halterm/south end container terminal, as well as many residential areas in the north end and Clayton Park, where many of the park's employees live. It is also located at the terminus of four highways:  (via Windmill Road/ and /Bedford Bypass),   and  via .

Furniture manufacturer, Swedwood Canada began operations in Burnside Park in 1987. From 1991–2004 the company was operated by IKEA. In 2004 Scanwood Canada purchased the company from IKEA Group with the assistance of Nova Scotia Business Inc. Now Nova Scotia owned, the company has diversified while continuing to maintain its IKEA contracts.

Due to the size and nature of the park, there are several hotels oriented towards business travellers located within its boundaries, including a Ramada, a Day's Inn, and a Comfort Inn.

The park includes the smaller City of Lakes business incubator park.

Burnside Park underwent an expansion in its eastern end during 2006 with the adjacent development of the Dartmouth Crossing retail and office development.

Major companies located in Burnside/City of Lakes
This incomplete list should only include companies with articles on Wikipedia.

AB Volvo (Mack Trucks)
Aliant
AMEC
Atlantic Lottery Corporation
Automatic Data Processing
Burnside Combustion Turbine
Burger King
Canadian National Railway
Canada Post
Canadian Red Cross
Central Nova Scotia Correctional Facility
Convergys Corporation - Closed
DHL
Eaton Corporation
Emergency Health Services
FedEx
Halliburton
Halifax Chronicle-Herald
Halifax Daily News
Halifax Regional Municipality - Municipal Archives
Halifax Regional Police
Helly-Hansen
Heritage Gas Limited
Honda
Hyundai
IKEA
IKON Office Solutions
ING Group
Irving Oil
Konica Minolta
Lawtons Drugs Head Office
Leon's
Lockheed Martin Canada Maritime Advanced Training and Test Site
MacDonald Dettwiler
Maritimes & Northeast Pipeline
McDonald's
Medavie Blue Cross
Metro Transit
Nova Scotia Power
PCL Constructors Canada
Pepsi Bottling Group
Petro-Canada
Purolator Courier
Rockwell Automation
Rogers Communications
Royal & Sun Alliance plc
Scotiabank
Sharp Corporation
Siemens AG 
Staples Business Depot
Shell Canada
Telus
Tim Hortons
Toshiba
Toyota
Wendy's
Xerox TeleWeb Centre
Ultramar
Unisys 
Wawanesa Mutual Insurance Co.
WESCO International

References

External links
Burnside Park - Official website 
Development requirements PDF (Aesthetic standards for new development, etc.)
BurnsidePark.com - Comprehensive Burnside Park Directory 
Somewhat outdated map
Satellite view of Burnside Business Park on Google Maps
Burnside News
Greater Burnside Business Association

Industrial parks in Canada
Business parks of Canada
Communities in Halifax, Nova Scotia
Power centres (retail) in Canada
Dartmouth, Nova Scotia